Stephen Schneider (born August 9, 1980) is an American actor, writer and entrepreneur, best known for his roles as Jeremy Santos on Broad City, and Ty Wyland on You're the Worst.

Early life
Schneider was born in Sharon, Massachusetts, to a Jewish family.

Personal life
In 2013, Schneider married actress Jenn Proske (who converted to Judaism upon marrying him).

Filmography

Film

Television

References

External links

Living people
1980 births
American male film actors
American male television actors
Jewish American male actors
People from Sharon, Massachusetts
Emory University alumni